Henricus Franciscus Caroluszoon (Hendrik) Tollens (24 September 1780 – 21 October 1856) was a Dutch poet best known for Wien Neêrlands Bloed, the national anthem of the Netherlands between 1815 and 1932.

The Tollens Prize is named after him.

Works 
 Gedichten (1808)
 Idyllen en minnezangen (1801–1805)
 Konstanten: ein Trauerspiel
 Laatste gedichten (1848–1853)
 Nieuve gedichten (1821)
 Romanzen, balladen en legenden (1818)
 Tafereel van de overwintering der Nederlanders op Nova Zembla in de jaren 1596 en 1597 (1816)

References 
 Huygens, Gerard W. Hendrik Tollens: de dichter van de burgerij, een biografie en een tijdbeeld. – Rotterdam: Nijgh & van Ditmar, 1972
 Schotel, Gilles D.: Tollens en zijn tijd: een proeve van levensbeschrijving. – Tiel: van Wermeskerken, 1860

External links 
 

1780 births
1856 deaths
Dutch male poets
Writers from Rotterdam